Kate L. Dixon Fick Jeancon (born June 5, 1884) was an official court reporter.

Early life
Kate L. Dixon was born in Winnipeg, Manitoba, Canada, on June 5, 1884, the daughter of Thomas Dixon and Emma Eleanor Woodcock.

Career
Since 1908 Kate L. Fick Jeancon was an official Court reporter, she was the first woman in the profession in Winnipeg, and later in Vancouver, British Columbia. She was also the only woman holding such an official position in the San Diego Superior Courts. 

She was a member of the San Diego Business & Professional Women's Club.

Personal life
Kate L. Fick Jeancon moved to California in 1914 and had one son Dr. Frank J. Perkins. She lived at 2742 A. Street, San Diego, California.

References

1884 births
American women writers
People from San Diego
Year of death missing